Royal Aviation Company may refer to:

 KLM, The Netherlands
 Royal Aviation, Canada
 Royal Aviation Company KSCC, subsidiary of Kuwait Airways